Boa Vista Creole is the name given to the variant of Cape Verdean Creole spoken mainly in the Boa Vista Island of Cape Verde. It belongs to the Barlavento Creoles branch. This form of Cape Verdean Creole was spoken by 5,000 ppl. (1.13% of the national population) in 2007 and is the least spoken form of Creole in the language. Literature is rarely recorded but one of the speakers who was born on the island is Germano Almeida.

As the island population doubled to over 8,000 in 2010, most of the population continue to speak the form of Cape Verdean Creole, some rarely speak the common Badiu by newcomers or both.  Some immigrants abroad continue to speak the Creole form as a second language.

Characteristics
Besides the main characteristics of Barlavento Creoles the Boa Vista Creole has also the following ones:
 The progressive aspect of the present is formed by putting tâ tâ before the verbs: tâ + tâ + V.
 In the verbs that end by ~a, that sound  is replaced by  when the verb is conjugated with the first person of the singular pronoun. Ex.: panhó-m’  instead of panhâ-m’  “to catch me”, levó-m’  instead of levâ-m’  “to take me”, coçó-m’  instead of coçâ-m’  “to scratch me”.
 The stressed e is always open . Ex.: bucé  instead of bocê  “you (respectful form), drét’  instead of drêt’  “right”, tchobé  instead of tchovê  “to rain”. The stressed o is always open . Ex.: bó  instead of bô  “you”, compó  instead of compô  “to fix”, tórrt’  instead of tôrt’  “crooked”.
 The sound  at the end of syllables is pronounced . Ex.: furrtâ  instead of furtâ  “to steal”, m’djérr  instead of m’djêr  “woman”, pórrt’  instead of pôrt’  “harbor”.
Ex.: cárr  instead of cás  “which ones”, érr  instead of ês  “they”, quérr  instead of quês  “those”.
Ex. jantâ  instead of djantâ  “to dine”, jôg’  instead of djôgu  “game”, but in words like djâ  “already” and Djõ  “John”, the sound  remains.

Vocabulary

Grammar

Phonology

Alphabet

References

Further reading
 A Parábola do Filho Pródigo no crioulo de Santiago, do Fogo, da Brava, de Santo Antão, de S. Nicolau e da Boa Vista: O crioulo de Cabo Verde (Botelho da Costa, Joaquim Vieira & Custódio José Duarte, 1886)

Boa Vista, Cape Verde